The Alexandrian World Chronicle or Chronographia Golenischevensis is an anonymous Greek chronicle compiled in Alexandria, recording history from Creation until the year 392 AD. The chronicle survives in the fragments of a  papyrus named the Golenischev papyrus, well known for its examples of early historical illumination.

Papyrus
The Golenischev (or Goleniščev) papyrus is a fragmentary illuminated papyrus which serves as the primary source for reproductions of the Alexandrian World Chronicle. It has been named after the Russian Egyptologist Vladimir Golenishchev who obtained it at some point before 1901 from one 'Sheikh Ali' in Giza.

The papyrus is extant in 80 fragments of Alexandrian majuscule text currently housed at the Pushkin Museum with marginal illustrations depicting - among other figures - Roman kings, a map of the Mediterranean, Old Testament prophets and characters, and personifications of the Roman months. The best preserved fragment (Pl. VI verso) depicts Pope Theophilus atop the Serapeum and has been called an "iconic image [...] in the history of Late Antique Alexandria"; the fragment has been used by historian Johannes Hahn to date the destruction of the Serapeum to 392 AD though this date has been criticised by Adolf Bauer, R. W. Burgess and Jitse H. F. Dijkstra as having little authority.

In 1905, the Greek text of the Chronicle was published as Eine Alexandrinische Weltchronik, edited together from papyrus fragments of the Golenischev Papyrus by Josef Strzygowski and Adolf Bauer with glass plates containing colored facsimiles of the illuminated fragments (see below). The fragments were obtained from Vladimir Golenishchev and reconstructed to form images of what the text may have looked like. The fragments of the Golenischev papyrus have since been mishandled and their quality is greatly reduced from when Strzygowski and Bauer reproduced them.

Text
The Excerpta Latina Barbari, a late 8th-century Latin chronicle, appears to be partly based on the Chronicle. Burgess and Dijkstra have conjectured that both texts are based on a common source composed of the  Chronographiae of Julius Africanus and the  Liber generationis.

Gallery
The following plates and captions adapted from :

References

Bibliography

External links 

6th-century illuminated manuscripts
Ancient Greece
Egyptian papyri containing images
History of Alexandria
Illuminated histories
Manuscripts of the Austrian National Library
Antiquities of the Pushkin Museum
Byzantine illuminated manuscripts